Joseph Mulema  (born 13 September 1982) is a welterweight boxer from Cameroon who fought at the 2008 Olympics. He won a gold medal in the men's welterweight event at the 2011 All-Africa Games.

World Series of Boxing record

Professional boxing record

References

External links

1982 births
Living people
Welterweight boxers
Boxers at the 2008 Summer Olympics
Olympic boxers of Cameroon
Cameroonian male boxers
African Games gold medalists for Cameroon
African Games medalists in boxing
Competitors at the 2011 All-Africa Games
Boxers at the 2010 Commonwealth Games
Commonwealth Games competitors for Cameroon
21st-century Cameroonian people